After the Second World War, the Deutsche Reichsbahn in East Germany had a requirement for powerful goods train locomotives with a 15-18 tonne axle load for routes in the Mittelgebirge, the mountainous areas in the south of the country. As a result, the DR Class 58.30 emerged, as part of the so-called 'reconstruction programme', based on rebuilds of the former Prussian G 12 locomotives (later DRG Class 58.2-5, 10-21). Between 1958 and 1962, 56 locomotives, originally from various state railways (even several former Alsace locomotives) were converted at the former repair shop, RAW Zwickau.

As part of this rebuild, the engines were given welded driver's cabs, newly designed boilers (the Rekokessel) with combustion chambers, mixer-preheater systems, new welded cylinders, Trofimoff valves and Witte smoke deflectors. The reinforced Type 58E Rekokessel was a slightly modified Type 50E boiler, that was also installed on e.g. the Rekoloks of Class 50.35 and Class 52.80 as well as the DR Neubaulok, the DR Class 23.10. Due to the longer boiler, the frame also had to be extended. The distance between the carrying axle wheelset and the first coupled axle increased by around 300 mm and the overall wheelbase of the locomotive from 8,500 to 8,800 mm. That and other changes meant that the permitted top speed could be raised from 65 km/h to 70 km/h.

After the reconstruction, the Class 58.30, with its new cab, higher-pitched boiler, steep smokebox skirts and two main air reservoirs located above the cylinders, had a completely new and striking appearance. Compared with the original Prussian G 12 engines, the reconstructed locomotives were more powerful, more economical and faster. The engine crews were very pleased with the larger reserves of power of the new boiler. On the plains, the Reko-G12 matched the performance of the DRG Class 44. That said, the 58.30 was the most expensive locomotive of the entire reconstruction programme due to its extensive modernisation.

Because the delivery of new tenders in the required quantities was not possible for various reasons and the original pr 3 T 20 and sä 3 T 21 tenders could not be used for safety reasons, there was a major shortage of tenders for this class for a long time. So the Class 58.30 was coupled with almost all available types of four-axled tender to begin with. For example, there are official photographs of engines with the large 2'2'T34 standard tenders as well as the 2'2'T30 tub tenders.

The rebuilt locomotives were primarily stationed in Saxony and Thuringia, above all in the locomotive depots (Bahnbetriebswerk or Bw) of Aue, Döbeln, Dresden-Friedrichstadt, Gera, Gotha and Saalfeld. The last surviving engines were homed at Glauchau. On 12 February 1981, numbers 58 3028 and 58 3032 were taken out of service a Bw Glauchau, thus ending the official deployment of Class 58.30 steam locomotives.

Two locomotives (of Prussian origin) have been preserved as non-working examples for posterity.

Locomotive no 58 3047, reconstructed in 1961 from 58 1955 (ERFURT 5672), (Linke-Hofmann-Busch Breslau 1920) is looked after today by the interest group of the same name in Glauchau. In Schwarzenberg, the Verein Sächsischer Eisenbahnfreunde ('Saxon Railway Friends Society') accommodates and maintains locomotive no. 58 3049, which was rebuilt from 58 1725 (KÖLN 5617), (Hannoversche Maschinenbau Hannover 1920). The former museum locomotive is coupled with a new-design 2'2' T 28 tender; the latter with a 2'2' T 31.5 rebuild tender from a Prussian P 10.

See also 
 List of East German Deutsche Reichsbahn locomotives and railbuses
 Rekolok

References

External links 
 IG 58 3047 Glauchau
 Verein Sächsischer Eisenbahnfreunde (Saxon Railway Friends) site

58.30
2-10-0 locomotives
58.30
Railway locomotives introduced in 1958
Standard gauge locomotives of Germany
1′E h3 locomotives
Freight locomotives